Zhang Lei (born April 4, 1981 in Shandong) is a male Chinese racing cyclist, who has twice competed for China at the Olympic Games.

Sports career
1999 Shandong Provincial Cycling Team;
2005 National Team

Major performances
2001 National Games - 2nd team sprint;
2002 National Championships - 1st sprint;
2006 Asian Games - 2nd team sprint;
2007 Asian Championships - 1st team sprint;
2008 World Championships - 7th team sprint;
2010 World Cup Classic, Beijing, China - 1st team sprint (5th overall World Cup rank at end of series);
2010 World Championships, Ballerup, Denmark - 4th team sprint;
2010 Asian Games, Guangzhou, China - 1st team sprint, 1st individual sprint

Records
2002 Moscow - 11th sprint (NR)

References

1981 births
Living people
Chinese male cyclists
Cyclists at the 2008 Summer Olympics
Cyclists at the 2012 Summer Olympics
Olympic cyclists of China
Sportspeople from Jinan
Chinese track cyclists
Cyclists from Shandong
Asian Games medalists in cycling
Cyclists at the 2002 Asian Games
Cyclists at the 2006 Asian Games
Cyclists at the 2010 Asian Games
Asian Games gold medalists for China
Asian Games silver medalists for China
Medalists at the 2006 Asian Games
Medalists at the 2010 Asian Games
21st-century Chinese people